Panlong may refer to:

 Panlongcheng or Panlong City, major archaeological site
 Panlong District (盘龙区), Kunming, Yunnan, China
 Panlong River (盘龙河), river in Kunming
 Panlong (mythology) (蟠龍), ancient motif in Chinese art
 Panlong Subtownship, Wa Self-Administered Division, Shan State, Myanmar
 Panlong or Pan Lon, capital of Panlong Subtownship
 Panlong Road Station, Shanghai Metro station

Towns
Written as "盘龙镇":
 Panlong, Rongchang County, in Rongchang County, Chongqing
 Panlong, Yunyang County, in Yunyang County, Chongqing
 Panlong, Queshan County, in Queshan County, Henan
 Panlong, Guangyuan, in Lizhou District, Guangyuan, Sichuan
 Panlong, Nanbu County, in Nanbu County, Sichuan

Written as "蟠龙镇":
 Panlong, Liangping County, in Liangping County, Chongqing
 Panlong, Baoji, in Jintai District, Baoji, Shaanxi
 Panlong, Yan'an, in Baota District, Yan'an, Shaanxi
 Panlong, Wuxiang County, in Wuxiang County, Shanxi

See also
Panglong (disambiguation)